Club Newman is an Argentine sports club located in the city of Benavídez of Tigre Partido, Greater Buenos Aires. The club is mostly known for its rugby union team, which currently plays in the Top 12, the first division of the Unión de Rugby de Buenos Aires league system. Newman's facilities also host other sports such as field hockey, football, golf, show jumping and tennis.

History 
The club was founded on December 15, 1975, by alumni of Cardinal Newman College. The first facilities were located in Benavidez, a district in Tigre Partido. The college had been established by the order of the Christian Brothers.

In 2004, the rugby team of the club reached the Torneo de la URBA semi-finals (where they lost to Alumni), one of its most important achievements, since they have never won any championships. In 2008, Newman reached the URBA TOP 14 final. In 2012 they reached semi-finals and in 2013 too. Also, they managed to get to other to finals in the Nacional de Clubes, one in 2014 and the last one in 2018. Most of Newman's members are former students of the homonymous college. Former president of Argentina Mauricio Macri was member of the club and played rugby there.

Notable rugby players who started their careers in Newman include Cristián Viel, Agustín Canalda, Francisco Irrarázabal, Felipe Contepomi, Manuel Contepomi, Marcos Ayerza, Gonzalo Gutiérrez Taboada, Miguel Urtubey, Marcos Bollini and Agustin Gosio.

References

External links
 
 Colegio Cardenal Newman website

n
N
n
N